Where the Sidewalk Ends is a 1974 children's poetry collection written and illustrated by Shel Silverstein. It was published by Harper and Row Publishers. The book's poems address many common childhood concerns and also present purely fanciful stories and imagination inspiring images. Based on a 2007 online poll, the National Education Association list the book as one of its "Teachers' Top 100 Books for Children." Controversial because of profanity and subject matter, the book was banned in many libraries and schools.

A 30th Anniversary Edition of the book appeared in 2004, and two audio editions (1983 and 2000) are also available.

Contents and editions
The collection contains a series of poems, including the title poem "Where the Sidewalk Ends", as well as illustrations. The author dedicated this book "For Ursula" and gives thanks to Ursula Nordstrom, Barbara Borack, Kadijah Cooper, Dorothy Hagen, Beri Greenwald, Gloria Bressler, and Bill Cole.
 
In 2004, a special 30th Anniversary Edition was published, which included 12 new poems.  The following titles are found only in the 30th Anniversary Edition:
 The Truth About Turtles
 Oops!
 Mr. Grumpledump's Song
 Naked Hippo 
 Who's Taller?
 Monsters
 Weightliftress
 Don't Tell Me
 Ten-O-Cycle
 The Unfunny Jester
 Open—Close
 Gorilla

Audio editions

Original album

The audio edition of the book was originally released as an album in 1983, which won the 1984 Grammy Award for Best Recording For Children. The collection is recited, sung, and shouted by Shel Silverstein himself and produced by Ron Haffkine. Released on Columbia/CBS Records, he also performed it at the 1984 Grammy Awards.

The following poems can be heard on the album:

Side A
Invitation – An unknown person wishing the reader to sit by their fire.
Eighteen Flavors – The narrator lists the flavors in his tall ice cream cone and is saddened when the ice cream falls on the ground.
Melinda Mae – A girl eats a whale (the process taking 89 years).
Sick – A little girl develops an ingenuitive plan to get out of school before realizing it isn't needed.
Ickle Me, Pickle Me, Tickle Me Too- These three characters run away in a flying shoe.
Enter This Deserted House- A decrepit house and its dwellers are described.
Jimmy Jet and His TV Set – What happens to most modern humans, a boy watches TV for so long that he turns into one.
For Sale – Someone tries to sell his sister.
Warning – The poem warns of a snail living in people's noses that will bite their finger if they pick their nose.
The Yipiyuk – A Yipiyuk has bitten someone's toe, and will not come off.
Crocodile’s Toothache – A sadistic dentist is eaten by a crocodile.
Stone Telling – The author throws stones at windows to see if they're open or closed.
Ridiculous Rose – a ridiculous girl eats with her toes.
Boa Constrictor – A boa constrictor eats people.
Peanut–Butter Sandwich – One of Silverstein's longer poems, about a foolish young king who is obsessed with peanut butter to the point that it is all he eats and that the only lesson the schools in his kingdom teaches is "how to make a peanut butter sandwich". One day he eats an extra sticky peanut butter sandwich which cements his mouth shut. Various methods fail until everyone in the kingdom works together with hooks to pry his mouth open. The people expect the king to have learned his lesson and try some other foods, but his first saying after being saved is (albeit weakly) "Would anyone like a peanut butter sandwich?"
Listen to the Mustn’ts – Although pessimists argue otherwise, anything is possible. 
I Will Not Hatch – A chick will not hatch because of the terrible descriptions of what's going on in the world.

Side B
Hug o’ War- The narrator states that  a hugging game is more fun than tug-o-war.
Smart – A boy is paid a dollar by his father, and soon ends up with five pennies by trading money with his friends. He thinks he’s very smart for doing so, but his father shakes his hand in disbelief that he has now been reduced to five cents.
The Farmer and the Queen – A queen is visiting a farm, and the farmer asks the animals for advice on what to do. At the advice of his dog, he bows to her and she smiles for his polite gesture.
The One Who Stayed – The story of the Pied Piper as told by a kid who was too scared to follow him.
No Difference – The author states that there'd be no prejudice if the world was completely dark.
Wild Boar – The author says that it doesn't matter how many teeth you say a boar has, because he doesn't know the answer himself.
Thumbs – A thumb-sucker praises the taste of his thumb.
Sarah Cynthia Silvia Stout Would Not Take The Garbage Out – A little girl refuses to take out her house's garbage, and soon, it piles up so much, everyone stays away from her house. By the time she decides to do so, it is already too late, and she ends up meeting a terrible fate that the author cannot recall (it is implied she was either consumed by the garbage or suffocated by its smell).
My Hobby – Someone spends their time spitting from a window of a tall building.
Early Bird- If you're a bird, get up early, but if you're a worm, sleep late.
Me–Stew – A cook makes stew out of himself.
Captain Hook- The narrator states that Captain Hook should be careful when using his hook, and is glad to not be him.
With His Mouth Full of Food – A boy ignores his parents' pleas to stop talking with his mouth full, and they have it glued shut as punishment.
The Flying Festoon – A child plans to fly around on a strange bird.
The Silver Fish – A boy catches a talking fish, who tricks the boy into setting him free by offering to grant him a wish. The second time the boy catches the fish, however, he doesn't fall for the trick.
The Generals – Two generals named General Clay and General Gore debate amongst themselves about having to "fight in this silly war". They instead suggest a holiday at the beach, which is well-received until they both are overcome with the thought of being dragged out to sea. Deciding that they do not want to die by drowning, they do their duty and charged off to war, "which is why we hear no more of General Clay or General Gore".
The Worst – Shel describes a horrible monster he says is standing behind the readers.
Dreadful – A baby girl has been devoured, and no one knows why it happened (the speaker burps at the end, and it is implied that they are the ones who did it).
My Beard- A man wears his long beard instead of clothes.
Producer & Director: Ron Haffkine, Keith Cozart
Engineer: jb & Danny Mundhenk & Oliver Masciarotte
Mastering: Denny Purcell

Recorded at Bullet Recording, Nashville, Blank Tapes, New York, and in Studio D at Criteria Recording in Miami, Florida.

25th anniversary album

In 2000, the album was re-released on cassette and CD for the 25th anniversary of the book. This collection is copyrighted 1984 and 2000 by Sony Music Entertainment Inc. The collection is again recited, sung, and shouted by Shel Silverstein.

The 25th anniversary edition also contains 11 previously unreleased tracks culled from the original master tapes. They are as follows:

The Little Blue Engine
If I Had a Brontosaurus
One Inch Tall
Long-Haired Boy
Rain
True Stories
Hungry Mungry
Standing
If The World Was Crazy
Hector the Collector
Spaghetti

References

External links

 

1974 children's books
1974 poetry books
American poetry collections
American children's books
Children's poetry books
Books by Shel Silverstein
HarperCollins books
1983 albums
Columbia Records albums